The Austria national ball hockey team has been representing Austria in the Ball Hockey World Championship since 1995. Is member of the International Street and Ball Hockey Federation (ISBHF).

World Championship

External links 
http://www.ballhockey.at/

Ball hockey
Men's sport in Austria
National sports teams of Austria